McVeytown is a borough in Mifflin County, Pennsylvania, United States, on the west bank of the Juniata River.  Formerly known as Waynesburg, it was settled in 1762, laid out in 1795, and incorporated in 1833. The population was 344 at the 2020 census. The "Father of Pennsylvania Forestry", Dr. Joseph Rothrock was born in McVeytown on April 9, 1839. He was largely responsible for the acquisition of the lands that became Pennsylvania state parks and forests, including Rothrock State Forest.

History
The settlement of what is now McVeytown was begun by Samuel Holliday in 1755,  but it was only in 1762 that he settled in permanently and not until 1795 that the town of Waynesburg (present day McVeytown) was laid out. John McVey owned the land and was the founder of McVeytown.

Samuel, Adam, John and William Holliday, and his two sisters, Elizabeth and Nancy, the latter of whom would become the wife of Andrew Bratton, immigrated to the U.S. in 1745 and located on the “manor” of Lancaster County. They moved later to Conococheague in what is now Franklin County, and John removed to Path Valley, where he lived and died. Adam and William took up land at Hollidaysburg, and it was from him that the borough took its name. In early 1775, Samuel Holliday and Andrew Bratton, just after the New Purchase of the Indians, went out into that region in search for land to settle. After they made a decision on the land, they went to the land-office, at the time located in Philadelphia, and in 1775 received their warrants. Bratton was in what is now Bratton Township, and Holliday at what is now McVeytown and vicinity.

Geography
McVeytown is located at  (40.497584, -77.740796). The unincorporated settlement Mattawana Village lies across the Juniata River, on its east bank.

Demographics

As of the census of 2000, there were 305 people, 168 households, and 115 families residing in the borough. The population density was 4,379.9 people per square mile (1,737.5/km2). There were 182 housing units at an average density of 1,968.2 per square mile (780.8/km2). The racial makeup of the borough was 99.26% White, 0.25% African American, and 0.49% from two or more races. Hispanic or Latino of any race were 0.25% of the population.

There were 168 households, out of which 29.2% had children under the age of 18 living with them, 53.6% were married couples living together, 11.3% had a female householder with no husband present, and 31.0% were non-families. 28.6% of all households were made up of individuals, and 18.5% had someone living alone who was 65 years of age or older. The average household size was 2.41 and the average family size was 2.91.

In the borough the population was spread out, with 21.7% under the age of 18, 5.4% from 18 to 24, 28.9% from 25 to 44, 18.8% from 45 to 64, and 25.2% who were 65 years of age or older. The median age was 41 years. For every 100 females there were 88.4 males. For every 100 females age 18 and over, there were 85.4 males.

The median income for a household in the borough was $32,500, and the median income for a family was $41,250. Males had a median income of $28,571 versus $19,286 for females. The per capita income for the borough was $16,116. About 3.5% of families and 6.5% of the population were below the poverty line, including 2.5% of those under age 18 and 7.6% of those age 65 or over.

References

Populated places established in 1762
Boroughs in Mifflin County, Pennsylvania
1833 establishments in Pennsylvania